YAA or yaa may refer to:

 Yorkshire Arts Association
 Young at Art Museum
 Young Artist Award
 European Film Academy Young Audience Award
 Youth Against AIDS, a disbanded international youth network founded in 1999
 Anahim Lake Airport, Anahim Lake, British Columbia, Canada
 Yodh, the tenth semitic letter. Named Yāʾ, Yaa or Ya'a in Arabic.
 Yaa dialect, a dialect of West Teke, a Bantu language spoken in the Republic of Congo and Gabon
 Yaminawa language (ISO 639-3: yaa), a Panoan language in Western Amazonia
 Yuya, Egyptian courtier during the eighteenth dynasty
 San Andrés Yaá, Oaxaca, Mexico
 Yaa (name)